Kannur International Airport  is an international airport serving the city of Kannur and the North Malabar region of Kerala, and Mahé district of Puducherry in India. It is owned and operated by Kannur International Airport Limited (KIAL), a public–private consortium. The airport opened for commercial operations on 9 December 2018.

The airport served one million passengers in just nine months since commercial operations began. Amidst the COVID-19 pandemic, the airport could maintain stable growth, and it achieved the milestone of two million passengers in the twenty-third month of operations in November 2020.

The first aircraft to land was an Indian Air Force (IAF) aircraft that touched down at the airport on 29 February 2016. The first trial passenger flight operation was conducted on 20 September 2018, using a Boeing 737-800 aircraft from Air India Express. On the inaugural day, 9 December 2018, an Air India Express flight IX 715 (Boeing 737-800) took off to Abu Dhabi at 10:13 (IST), becoming the first commercial passenger aircraft to depart from Kannur International Airport. The airport was inaugurated by then Minister of Civil Aviation, Suresh Prabhu and Chief Minister of Kerala, Pinarayi Vijayan.

History
Kannur had an airstrip used for commercial aviation as early as 1935 when TATA airlines operated weekly flights between Bombay and Trivandrum – stopping at Goa and Cannanore. This airstrip was located within the Kannur Cantonment area at Fort Maidan. The operator started service to Kerala on 29 October 1935 but service did not last long.

The long-standing demand for a full-fledged airport was only conceptualized in 1997, when C. M. Ibrahim the then union minister of civil aviation, backed the proposal for an airport in the district. The vast extent of land at Moorkhanparamba near Mattannur was identified for the project a few months later following a hectic search for land for developing the proposed airport. The then Chief Minister of Kerala V. S. Achuthanandan laid the foundation stone for the airport at the project site marking the formal commencement of construction activities on 17 December 2010 at a function attended by the then Civil Aviation Minister Praful Patel. Though the State government accorded sanction for the Kannur International Airport project in January 1998 and appointed Kerala Industrial Infrastructure Development Corporation (KINFRA) as the nodal agency for its implementation, it had to wait for a decade until it was finally approved by the Central government in January 2008. During the period, a private agency appointed by Kerala Industrial Infrastructure Development Corporation (KINFRA) to study techno-economic feasibility report submitted its report. The earlier site proposed at Madayipara was dropped owing to ecological concerns. Two vast plateaus near Mattannur were identified for the airport, namely Moorkhanparamb and Velliyamparamb, with about 1300 acres and 800 acres of land to be acquired from each respectively.

After a prolonged wait, the airport received in-principle approval from the Ministry of Civil Aviation and Union cabinet in January 2008. Land acquisition began in December 2008 after issuing notifications and fixing compensation. The public company Kannur International Airport Limited (KIAL), under the PPP model, was registered in October 2009. The foundation stone for the airport was laid on 17 December 2010 by then-Chief Minister V. S. Achuthanandan.
On 26 November 2013, KIAL and Larsen & Toubro Ltd are scheduled to sign a contract on construction work at the airport. In January 2014, The Kerala State Government Minister for Excise and Ports announced the Kerala State Government and AAI plan to sign an MoU on the equity structure of Kannur International Airport Limited.

Construction work of the airport was inaugurated by Defence Minister and senior Congress leader A. K. Antony on 2 February 2014. On 29 February 2016, The first trial flight was landed and Chief Minister Oommen Chandy Flag off for the inauguration of Runway.

Kannur International Airport commenced operations on 9 December 2018. The first commercial aircraft to operate out of the airport was Air India Express IX 715 (Boeing 737-800) to Abu Dhabi, which took off at 10:13 (IST) on the same day. The flight was jointly flagged off by the Chief Minister of Kerala, Pinarayi Vijayan and Union Minister for Civil Aviation, Suresh Prabhu.
	
Aircraft of several foreign airlines touched down for the first time at Kannur international airport in June 2020 as part of the repatriation flights arranged owing to the COVID-19.	
Widebody aircraft also landed for the first time in June. Airbus A330-200 of Kuwait Airways, was the first foreign airline and also the first widebody aircraft that landed at Kannur. The aircraft of Kuwait Airways,Fly Dubai,Jazeera Airways,Salam Air,Gulf Air,Air Arabia, Etihad Airways,Saudia, and Oman Air operated to and from Kannur during June–August 2020 as repatriation/chartered flights.	
Though several international airlines have reportedly shown interest in operating from Kannur, they are unable to operate regularly scheduled flights from Kannur airport as the airport lacks  ‘point of call’ status.

Construction
By August 2010, acquisition of about 1200 acres of land was completed in two phases, and acquisition of another 780 acres was in progress for the third phase.

In July 2011, the Oommen Chandy government decided to make Airports Authority of India a consultant tasked with preparing a revised techno-economic feasibility report and a new master plan and design. As the Airports Authority of India failed to submit the report in time, the consultancy was canceled and Cochin International Airport (CIAL) was entrusted to prepare the detailed project report, but the floating of tenders for construction was further delayed as experts found several technical flaws in the design prepared by CIAL.

Land acquired by the government under KINFRA was transferred to KIAL earlier in February 2012. In August 2012, Mumbai based company STUP Consultants Pvt Ltd. was made consultant to review the revised report by CIAL and to assist KIAL in other aspects of the project, but the agreement was canceled within two weeks as it was found that the company had been blacklisted in other states. Fresh bids were solicited and Hong Kong-based AECOM Asia was awarded the consultancy. The project office was inaugurated at Mattannur in December 2012.

EPC-I & EPC-II

It was decided to build the airport in two stages of engineering, procurement, and construction (EPC). The first stage, EPC-I included complete earthwork, runway, taxiway, apron, ground lighting and associated infrastructure such as perimeter and operational walls.

The second stage, EPC-II, involved the integrated terminal building, air traffic control tower, administrative and technical blocks, and facilities in the buildings such as aerobridges, escalators, elevators and counters. Infrastructure and engineering conglomerate Larsen & Toubro (L&T) was awarded work for EPC-I on 27 November 2013, after inviting bids. Airport work was flagged off by the then Defense Minister A.K. Antony at a public function in Mattannur on 2 February 2014. L&T also won the tender for EPC-II works including the construction of the passenger terminal building (PTB) on 25 June 2014. About 50% of the land works and foundation and piling work for constructing the PTB and air traffic control tower were completed by March 2015. By August 2015, about 60% of the runway was completed. Steps were initiated to procure lifts, a baggage handling system, passenger boarding bridges, and the four Airfield Crash Fire Tenders. About 70% of the work on the runway, apron and associated work, and 52% of the PTB and allied work was completed by December 2015. Works for a  fuel farm also began the same month. Meanwhile, the third phase of land acquisition involving about 785 acres on Velliyamparmb, which began in 2011, had been progressing at a very slow pace and only 612 acres were acquired in five years.

A trial landing was conducted on a completed  runway by a 14-seater code B aircraft on 29 February 2016. The air traffic control tower was not involved as it was still under construction. Technical assistance of the Aviation Control of the Calicut airport was sought for the landing. No runway calibration, or testing of flight parameters, was done during the landing. The trial landing was organized as a major event by the authorities and involved extensive public participation. The Oommen Chandy government faced fierce criticism for organizing such an event when the whole airport project was not complete. The opposition termed it an "election stunt" as Kerala was going to the polls in the coming months. Around  were spent on the event.

By May 2016, the  runway was completed with work on the  grading side strip on both ends progressing. 68% of the PTB, 75% of the ATC tower and much of the work for the fuel farm was completed. Work on the ancillary buildings – fire rescue station, power house, the area for the India Meteorological Department (IMD), sewage treatment plant, service block, and the airfield ground lighting substation were progressing.

Phase I & Phase II

The Phase I expansion period is from 2016–17 to 2025–26. It includes a  runway extension, a full-length taxiway, commissioning of a fuel farm, an aviation academy etc. and developing city side facilities. Works for the Phase-I expansion are already progressing. A cargo terminal and cargo complex which was initially in Phase-II has been shifted to Phase I and is under construction. The Phase II expansion will happen from 2026–27 to 2045–46. It includes another runway and a dedicated domestic terminal at Veliamparamba, and a long flyover to link it with Moorkhanparamba.

Management
Kannur International Airport is the second greenfield airport to be built on a public private partnership (PPP) platform in Kerala. The airport is managed by Kannur International Airport Ltd.(KIAL), a public company. Venu V, IAS, is the current managing director of KIAL. Chief minister of Kerala holds the post of chairman. The principle investor in KIAL, the Government of Kerala, owns 32.86% of the company's shares. Other shareholders are: 22.54% by State and Central Public Sector Undertakings, 9.39% by Airports Authority of India, 35.21% by others, including QIBs, Individuals, Companies, Cooperative, Banks/Societies, and other legal entities as approved by the Board of Directors from time to time.

Facilities

Terminals

It is able to handle up to 2,000 passengers during peak hours with its unique swing facility. It features six aerobridges with 48 check-in counters, 32 emigration counters, 16 customs counters, four conveyor belts and access control inside the terminal. The passenger terminal will use the swing facility. The international gates are used for domestic operations when there are no international flights. The passenger terminal building has a double skin aluminium roofing system and efficient LED lighting adopting the green building concept.

Cargo terminal

A cargo terminal complex having an 8-floor space of  will also be constructed.

Airlines and destinations

Statistics

Operational infrastructure

Runway 07/25 orientation permits an obstacle-free approach. Runway 25's end will have Category I approach lighting and the 07 end will have simple approach lighting. The runway will be extended to  after the airport is commissioned. Land acquisition of about 260 acres is underway for this purpose. The runway will have a full-length parallel taxiway and its apron will allow 20 wide-bodied aircraft to park simultaneously.

The airport's air navigation services and air traffic control will be handled by the Airports Authority of India (AAI). The ATC tower will be equipped with Doppler variable omni range and distance measuring equipment, air traffic system automation, instrument landing system, voice recorder, and a GPS clock system. It will have VHF communication facilities and equipment for obtaining radar signals from the Cochin International Airport.

Various weather monitoring, weather forecasting and alert systems are being installed at the airport by the India Meteorological Department (IMD). The Automated Weather Observing System (AWOS) for weather observations, is supplemented by climatological data, weather forecasting and aerodrome warning from IMD. The IMD will send minute-by-minute weather updates in the form of audio messages directly to pilots, instead of passing the information manually to the ATC and through them to the pilot. The information could include wind speed, gusts and direction, temperature and dew point, visibility, density, altitude, thunderstorm, lightning etc. ensuring smooth aircraft operation.

The airport will have a -long, -wide runway end safety area (RESA) on both ends of the runway. This reduces the risk of casualties and damage to aircraft in the event of an undershoot, overshoot or excursion from the runway. The RESA is protected with a reinforced earth wall. The airport will have an isolation bay towards the 07 side.

Various ground support equipment (GSE) will be available to service the aircraft between flights. These include dollies, chocks, aircraft service stairs, aircraft refuelers, transporters, catering vehicles, and belt loaders. Ground handling in the airport will be managed by Air India Air Transport Services Ltd. (AI-ATSL).

Aviation fuel farm
The airport has a  fuel farm constructed and operated as a joint venture company floated by KIAL and Bharat Petroleum Corporation Ltd. (BPCL) — the BPCL-KIAL Fuel Farm Private Ltd. The Rs. 17-crore fuel farm has underground tanks for aviation fuel storage and will provide fuel for aircraft operating from the airport. BPCL has a Rs. 170-crore stake in KIAL.

MRO
Kannur Airport will have an aircraft maintenance, repair and overhaul unit- MRO facility. A large maintenance terminal is dedicated for this. The facility is expected to cater to both narrow and wide-bodied aircraft. The MRO will undertake maintenance work on aircraft and their components, such as jet engines, landing gear, air frames and components and will involve line maintenance and hangars.

Enclaves
The airport will have an Indian Navy air enclave on convert ten acres of land. Ezhimala is also a strategic defense location. The original demands for transfer of the ten acres of airport land to the Navy included having a representative from Southern Naval Command on KIAL's board of directors, to set up the enclave. This was dropped by the Navy. The land was transferred to the Navy on a long-term lease against token rent for establishing the enclave.

The Indian Air Force will have a presence at the airport with a separate enclave set up on ten acres of land. Defense officials had approved the enclave in view of the airport's strategic location. The land provided on a long-term lease, against a token rent, is located beside the operational apron of the airport. Work on the enclave's hangars and administrative buildings is underway.

An enclave will be set up by Indian Coast Guard (ICG) at the Kannur airport to augment air surveillance along the coast. India's first Coast Guard Academy is located at Azhikkal,  from the airport. Considering this, the strategic location and the proximity to the coast of the airport the ICG had sought 20 acres of airport land. The KIAL board authorized the airport's managing director to provide 10 acres on a long-term lease against token rent to establish the enclave.

Aviation academy
An aviation academy will be set up in the airport by the Rajiv Gandhi Aviation Academy and Technology on two acres of land allotted for it. The institute will offer students courses in aeronautics and provide flight training.

HAL helicopter manufacturing base
Hindustan Aeronautics Limited (HAL) had sought airport land from KIAL to have a manufacturing base for helicopters. 80 acres of land had been allotted by the board to HAL in 2014. The HAL complex will include helicopter manufacturing for exporting, helicopter maintenance and repair, and a helicopter pilot training centre.

Law and Order
The airport comes under the jurisdiction of Mattanur Airport Police station under Kannur City Police established on 12 August 2018. The jurisdictional area coming inside the airport compound wall in Morkanparamaba in Keezhallur Panchayat and area of Kallerikkara ward of Mattanur Municipality coming inside the Airport compound wall. The whole area of the station is owned by KIAL. The magisterial jurisdiction of the station is Judicial First Class Magistrate Court, Mattanur.

Connectivity
Pre-paid taxi service is available at the airport round the clock. KSRTC provides service to various destinations in Kannur, Kasaragod, Kozhikode and Malappuram districts from the airport. Autorickshaw service is available at the airport to Mattannur. The closest railway stations are at Thalassery and Kannur from the airport. Till date, there is no Uber or Ola Cabs service facility from the airport.

Future developments
The proposed Kannur-Mysore National Highway under Bharatmala project, passes through Airport provides easy access to the important cities and towns in Kerala and Karnataka states.

Kerala government has given node for developing Mattanur-Kootupuzha road, Thalassery-Anjarakandy-Mattanur road, Kuttiady-Panoor-Mattanur road, Mananthavady-Mattanur road, Kannur-Airport roads for better connectivity.

See also
 Calicut International Airport
 Mangalore International Airport
 Cochin International Airport
 Trivandrum International Airport
 List of Airports in Kerala
 Airports in India
 Thalassery
 Kannur
 Payyanur

References

External links

 Profile of Kannur International Airport by CAPA - Centre for Aviation

Buildings and structures in Kannur district
Airports in Kerala
International airports in India
Transport in Kannur district
2018 establishments in Kerala
Airports established in 2018
History of Kerala (1947–present)